Ybbs an der Donau (short: Ybbs) is a town in Austria. It was established in 1317. Throughout the town, from the intersection of the important trade routes and along the Danube the town has preserved a site that already had great economic importance during the Middle Ages.

Toponymy
The valley of the Ybbs river is called: Ybbs Valley, or Ybbs Field.

History
In 788, Ybbs Field was the site of a battle, between Franks and Avars.

Railroad bridge was dive-bombed by 14th FG on 26 March 1945 at 1020 hrs;  Direct hit on abutments, south approach cut, main line blocked.

Coat of arms
On a silver shield lies a red city wall with battlements that an open gate and raised portcullis, which are dominated by two towers. Between the towers floats a green Linden bough, and the red-white-red Bindenschild.

Colors: Red-White-Red
Coat of Arms Bestowal: unknown; at least since the 14th century.

International relations

Twin towns — Sister cities
Ybbs an der Donau is twinned with:
 Bobbio, Italy

Business and Infrastructure
In northwestern Ybbs is the Ybbs-Persenbeug Power Station, the first river-water-run power plant on the Austrian Danube. WIlly Höhn, a Coburg native came from Stettin. In 1939, he insisted that one of his special constructions was implemented.
Between November 11, 1907, and September 22, 1953, Ybbs was on the Ybbser Highway, maybe the shortest tramway line in the world. It was 2.94 km long and connected the town with the Westbahn train station in Ybbs-Kemmelbach.

See also
 List of cities and towns in Austria
 Ybbs Valley Railway

Notes
 The information in this article is based on and/or translated from its German equivalent.

References

Sources

External links
 R.-k. The Parish of Ybbs an der Donau
 Bobbio, Italy

Cities and towns in Melk District
Populated places on the Danube